For other places with the same name, see Havelock (disambiguation)

Havelock is a township in Le Haut-Saint-Laurent Regional County Municipality in southern Quebec, Canada. The population as of the Canada 2011 Census was 756. Neighbouring townships include Franklin to the west, St-Chrysostome to the north and Hemmingford to the east. Havelock's southern boundary is situated along the Canada–United States border with New York State, United States.

Located within Havelock is Covey Hill, one of the northernmost hills of the Adirondack Mountains and the highest point in Le Haut-Saint-Laurent Regional County Municipality.

History
Named after Major-General Sir Henry Havelock, a British general who served in India, the township was created in 1863 from the west end of Hemmingford Township.

Geography

Communities
The following locations reside within the municipality's boundaries:
Domaine-Enchanté – a cottage community just west of Covey Hill situated on the north shore of Lac-Enchanté.
Russeltown Flats – a hamlet located in the northern portion.
The Fort – a hamlet located in the southeast portion on Route 202.

Lakes & Rivers
The following waterways pass through or are situated within the municipality's boundaries:
Le Gouffre – a small lake southwest of Lac Enchanté.

Topographic Features
Covey Hill – a mountain situated west of the hamlet of Covey Hill. At , it is the highest point in Le Haut-Saint-Laurent.

Demographics 

Arts and culture
The town is noted for its annual agricultural fair, Havelock Fair, held every September. It showcases the best the local countryside has to offer. It was founded in 1871 and is one of the oldest fairs in Canada.

See also
 Le Haut-Saint-Laurent Regional County Municipality
 English River (Chateauguay River tributary)
 List of township municipalities in Quebec

References

Rootsweb South West Quebec

External links

Havelock Fair
Havelock official website
 Chateauguay Valley
The Russeltown Flatts Church
 Apples
Covey Hill

Township municipalities in Quebec
Incorporated places in Le Haut-Saint-Laurent Regional County Municipality